Paul Derek Gibbs (born 26 October 1972) is an English former professional footballer.

Career
Gibbs, a left back, began his career at Norwich City as a youngster, followed by an apprenticeship at Scunthorpe United. On not making the grade as a pro, he drifted into local football, playing for Gorleston and later scoring the winner from the penalty spot in the 1994 FA Vase Final at Wembley for Diss Town against Taunton Town. He later played in Norway and had brief trial spell at Luton Town, before joining Colchester United on 6 March 1995.

After 53 league games, in which he scored three goals, and only shortly after appearing at Wembley for a second time in the Auto-Windscreens Trophy final defeat at the hands of Carlisle United, he was given a free transfer, joining Torquay United on 26 July 1997. His Torquay debut came on the first day of the 1997–98 season, a 2–1 defeat away to newly promoted Conference champions Macclesfield Town. That season saw Gibbs score seven goals in 41 league games en route to the Division Three play-offs and ultimately defeat in the final at Wembley against Colchester. In just that one season his wing-back partnership with Andy Gurney resulted in 16 goals between the two of them. Gibbs followed departing Torquay manager Kevin Hodges to Plymouth Argyle on 26 July 1998 thanks to the Bosman ruling, though his then girlfriend Helen Chamberlain of Sky Sports' Soccer AM fame refused to follow suit and stayed loyal to the Gulls. His Plymouth career started successfully enough, being named in the Division Three team for the 1998–99 season. However, on the final day of the season, Gibbs suffered a broken leg, putting paid to a planned move to Brentford. Incidentally, the same game in which he broke his leg was the famous Jimmy Glass game against Carlisle, in which the goalkeeper scored in the 94th minute to keep Carlisle United in the Football League.

Gibbs began playing again for Plymouth's reserves in March 2000. On 9 May 2000, Gibbs was given a free transfer by Plymouth, and on 18 May he signed for Brentford on a three-year contract. However, Brentford's financial situation in March 2002 saw Gibbs transfer listed.

On 15 March 2002, Gibbs joined Barnsley on a free transfer. He struggled with injury and in May 2003 underwent a groin operation. On 16 October 2003, Gibbs' contract with Barnsley was terminated. He was linked with Watford, Bradford City and Brentford. The latter of these he trained with during November 2003 and played for their reserves against Aldershot Town. He joined Gravesend & Northfleet later that month, leaving in January 2004.

At the end of March 2004, Gibbs joined Canvey Island until the end of the season. On 17 July 2004, Gibbs joined Steve Claridge's Weymouth on a one-year deal, but in January 2005 returned to Gorleston, later assisting with the coaching at the club.

Personal life 
After retiring from football, Gibbs set up P&S Personnel Services, a recruitment agency based in Great Yarmouth.

Honours

Club
Diss Town
 FA Vase winner: 1993–94
Colchester United
 Football League Trophy runner-up: 1996–97
Torquay United
 Football League Third Division play-off runner-up: 1997–98
Brentford
 Football League Trophy runner-up: 2000–01

Individual
 PFA Team of the Year: 1998–99

References

External links

1972 births
Living people
People from Gorleston-on-Sea
English footballers
Association football fullbacks
Diss Town F.C. players
Colchester United F.C. players
Torquay United F.C. players
Plymouth Argyle F.C. players
Brentford F.C. players
Barnsley F.C. players
Ebbsfleet United F.C. players
Canvey Island F.C. players
Weymouth F.C. players
Gorleston F.C. players
English Football League players